ABBAcadabra is a French children's musical based on songs from the pop group ABBA. It was originally produced for French television in 1983 by Alain and Daniel Boublil, but which was later also transferred to an English stage version and two other television programs. The story was not always the same as the selection of the chosen songs varied by productions.

Productions

Original French production
The French television production consisted of 12 ABBA songs with new French lyrics by Alain & Daniel Boublil, and the story was based on classic fairy tales like Sleeping Beauty, Cinderella, Pinocchio, Snow White and others. The cast was made up of children and well known French singers like Fabienne Thibeault, Daniel Balavoine, Plastic Bertrand, Maurice Barrier, Daniel Boublil (as 'Daniel Beaufixe'), Francoise Pourcel (as Marie Framboise), Catherine Ferry, Stéphane Le Navelan, Stéphane Boublil (son of Alain), Clémentine Autain and Emmanuelle Pailly. Anni-Frid Lyngstad, also known as "Frida", from ABBA was invited to play the part of "Belle au bois dormant" (Sleeping Beauty), and recorded the song "Belle" (a cover of ABBA's 1976 instrumental track "Arrival") as a duet with Daniel Balavoine.

Abbacadabra was originally broadcast on the French TV channel TF1 over Christmas in 1983.

A soundtrack album, entitled ABBAcadabra: Conte musical, featuring songs and narration from the production, was produced in 1983 as well. According to liner notes on the album cover, arrangements and musical direction were provided by Raymond Donnez and production by Alain Boublil with assistance by Raymond Donnez, Daniel Boublil, and Françoise Pourcel. The album was released by WEA Filipacchi Music in France and WEA Music of Canada in Québec.

The album spawned several single releases in France, including "Mon Nez Mon Nez" by Plastic Bertrand, "L'Enfant Do" by Stéphane Boublil, and the Frida and Daniel Balavoine duet "Belle," which also saw release outside France in a few European countries and Canada.

French musical numbers
 Qu'est-ce que j'vais faire plus tard (What I'm gonna do later) / When I Kissed the Teacher 
 Délivrés / The Visitors (Crackin' Up)
 Abbacadabra / Take a Chance on Me 
 Mon nez mon nez (My nose my nose) / Money Money Money
 Tête d'allumette (Match head) / Super Trouper 
 Imagine-moi (Imagine me) / I Wonder (Departure) 
 Carabosse super show / Dancing Queen 
 Pareils et mêmes (Same and same) / I Let the Music Speak 
 L'enfant do (Children do) / Fernando 
 Lâchez mes cassettes (Let go of my tapes) / I'm a Marionette 
 Belle (Beautiful) / Arrival 
 Envoyez le générique (Send the theme song) / Thank You for the Music

Original London production 
Cameron Mackintosh decided to produce a live-action English stage version of the TV show with lyrics by David Wood, Mike Batt, and Don Black. Benny Andersson and Björn Ulvaeus, who wrote the songs in ABBA, contributed with one new song, "(I Am) The Seeker."

The musical premiered 8 December 1983 at the Lyric Hammersmith theatre in London, to mixed reviews and full houses for 8 weeks, closing on 21 January 1984. Among the actors were Elaine Paige, Michael Praed, Nigel Harman, Finola Hughes, BA Robertson, and Jenna Russell. A couple of singles were released from the show in several European countries. These were produced and arranged by Mike Batt. One featured Elaine Paige's recording of "Like An Image Passing By," a cover of ABBA's "My Love, My Life", with a B side of Finola Hughes singing "When Dreamers Close Their Eyes". Another single (also released in Australia) paired Frida and B. A. Robertston singing "Time," an English version of "Belle"/"Arrival," with Robertson solo on the B-side singing "I Am The Seeker".

English musical numbers
  
 Another World (Take A Chance On Me)  
 Battle of The Brooms (Money, Money, Money)  
 (I Am) The Seeker (new song)  
 I Can Pull Some Strings (The Piper) 
 Going Going Gone (On and On and On) 
 Making Magic (Super Trouper) 
 When Dreamers Close Their Eyes (Like An Angel Passing Through My Room) 
 Belonging (I Let The Music Speak)
 Back Home Now (Fernando)  
 Carabosse Supershow (Dancing Queen) 
 Think Of Something Fast (I'm A Marionette) 
 Time (Arrival) 
 Like An Image Passing By (My Love, My Life) 
 Thank You For The Magic (Thank You For The Music)
 Finale

Other productions

Dutch production 
A Dutch version of this musical was recorded at the end of 1984 with José Hoebee and Marga Scheide (of Dutch girl group Luv') and aired on TV in 1985. Not all the songs were recorded, but the album released in Belgium on the Indisc label, featured the same songs as the French version. The album was recorded with Ron Brandsteder, Bonnie St. Claire, Benny Neyman, Marga Scheide, José Hoebee, Nico Haak, Willem Duijn, Bianca Folkers, & Nancy Dubbeldam. The frame story is that an evil 'video fairy' wants to ban and imprison the figures of the Fairy Tale on a videotape.

Dutch musical numbers 

 "Als Ik Later Groot Ben" (When I grow up) (When I Kissed The Teacher)
 "Wij Zijn Vrij" (We are free) (The Visitors (Cracking Up))
 Abbacadabra (Take A Chance On Me) Cinderella
 Me Neus, Me Neus (My nose, my nose) (Money Money Money) Pinocchio
 Het Liedje Van Alladin (The song of Aladdin) (Super Trouper)  Aladdin  
 Spiegel (Mirror) (I Wonder (Departure)) Snow White
 De Kokende Spoken Show (Cooking ghosts show) (Dancing Queen) 
 Toen Ik Een Wolfje Was (When I was a wolfie) (I Let The Music Speak) Big Bad Wolf  
 Naar Huis Toe (Homewards) (Fernando)
 Geef Die Banden Terug (Give back those tapes) (I'm A Marionette) The evil video fairy  
 Bij Mij (With me) (Arrival)  Sleeping Beauty
 Laat Het Feest Beginnen (Let the party begin!) (Thank You For The Music)

Portugal production 

A Portuguese version was also made for television, adapted into Portuguese by Nuno Gomes dos Santos, and an album released in 1984 on the Orfeu record label in Portugal.

Portuguese songs 

 Que Mal Fizemos Nós (What wrong have we done) (When I Kissed The Teacher)
 O Sonho De Joao (John's Dream) (The Visitors)
 Abbacadabra (Take A Chance On Me) 
 O Nariz De Pinóquio (Pinocchio's Nose) (Money Money Money)
 Aladin Fanfarrão (Aladdin's fanfare) (Super Trouper)
 Branca De Neve E O Espelho (Snow White And The Mirror) (I Wonder (Departure))
 Rainha Má Superstar (Evil Queen Superstar) (Dancing Queen)
 Cinderela E O Soldadinho (Cinderella And The Soldier) (I Let The Music Speak)
 Os Amigos (The friends) (Fernando)
 Larguem A Cassette (Let Go Of The Cassette) (I'm A Marionette)
 Branca De Neve E O Principezinho (Snow White And The Little Prince) (Arrival) 
 Não Basta Ralhar (Takes More Than Scolding) (Thank You For The Music)

Portuguese cast 
Aladino : Fernando
Alice : Suzy Paula
Blanca de Neve : Maria João
Cinderela: Helena Ramos
Pinóquio : Nuno Gomes dos Santos
Locutor : José Nuno Martins
Principezinho : Antonio Manuel Ribeiro
Raínha Má : Lenita Genti
Soldadinho : Samuel
Ana e Joana : As Gémeas
João e Pedro : João e Pedro Cabeleira
Rosas : Inês Martins, Teresa Marta e Isabel Campelo, Vanda e Ana Carvalho
Cravos e Metralhas : Zé da Ponte, Luis de Freitas e Nuno Gomes dos Santos

See also
Mamma Mia!, another musical based on the songs of ABBA

References

External links
 (defunct?) http://philippe.benabes.free.fr/abbacadabra/
ABBA-The Albums "ABBAcadabra" page http://felpin80.tripod.com/ata/acadab.html
 ABBA France&Belgique "ABBAcadabra" page http://abba.discographie.france.over-blog.com/tag/abbacadabra/

Jukebox musicals
Musical television specials
ABBA
1983 musicals